John Foster (born September 13, 1936) is an American former sports shooter. He competed at the 1960 Summer Olympics and the 1968 Summer Olympics.

References

1936 births
Living people
American male sport shooters
Olympic shooters of the United States
Shooters at the 1960 Summer Olympics
Shooters at the 1968 Summer Olympics
Sportspeople from Muskegon, Michigan
20th-century American people
21st-century American people